Colachel is an assembly constituency located in Kanniyakumari Lok Sabha Constituency in Kanyakumari district in Tamil Nadu. It is one of the 234 State Legislative Assembly Constituencies in Tamil Nadu, in India.

The Nadar community is the biggest community in this constituency with around 65% population.

The population of other communities are: Meenavar 22%, Paraiyar 5% and Muslims 4%.

Nair, Konar and Chettiyar are considerable others.

Travancore-cochin assembly

Madras State

Tamil Nadu assembly

Election results

2021

2016

2011

2006

2001

1996

1991

1989

1984

1980

1977

1971

1967

1962

1957

1954

References 

 

Assembly constituencies of Tamil Nadu
Kanyakumari